Dan Attoe is a painter, sculptor, and founder of the art group Paintallica. Attoe left the group in 2017, citing the creative differences. He is represented by Western Exhibitions, Chicago and works with The Hole, New York and L.A. 
Attoe was born in Bremerton, Washington in 1975 and moved through Idaho, Wisconsin, Minnesota and Iowa before choosing his current location Washougal, Washington where he owns and operates a tattoo shop - Dan's Tattoos.

Attoe attended the University of Wisconsin-Marathon County and the University of Wisconsin-Madison where he first studied psychology, and later art. During college, he worked at the Wausau Metals factory - now known as Wausau Window and Wall Systems. While he was there, among other projects, they made the windows and aluminum panels for the Getty Center in Los Angeles. He earned his bachelor's degree from UW- Madison in 1998. From 1998 to 2001 he worked at The Walker Art Center in Minneapolis, first as security and maintenance, then on the installation crew. He earned his M.F.A. at the University of Iowa in Iowa City in 2004.

Attoe's work often touches on the grittier parts of both rural and urban life colored with a mystical form of existentialism.

Recent  and upcoming solo exhibitions 
"The Dead of Winter", The Hole, New York 2022
"Pandemic Paintings", Western Exhibitions, Chicago 2021
"Dan Attoe", The Hole, New York 2020
"American Dreams," curated by Tania Pardo, MUSAC, Leon, Spain
 Group Exhibition, "Shape of Things to Come," Saatchi Gallery, London
 Group Exhibition, Contemporary Northwest Art Awards, Portland Art Museum, Portland
"Simple Thoughts and Complicated Animals," Peres Projects Berlin, Germany
"Several Landscapes," Western Exhibitions, Chicago, IL
"Loaded, Nailed, and short on Cash," Peres Projects, Los Angeles
"You have more freedom than you are using," Peres Projects, Berlin, Germany
"Vilma Gold," London, UK 404 Arte Contemporanea, Naples, Italy
"Some of the best things I know," Peres Projects, Los Angeles
"New Figuration," Galleri Christina Wilson, Copenhagen, Denmark
"Some of the Best Things I know," Peres Projects, Los Angeles

Recent group exhibitions 
"Gravity's Rainbow" October 20 - November 24, 2007 Athens, Greece
"8th Northwest Biennial," Tacoma Art Museum, Tacoma, Washington
"Phantasmania," Kemper Museum of Contemporary Art, Kansas City, Missouri
"1627-2007," artnews projects, Berlin, Germany
"Let's go camping," John Connelly Presents, New York City, NY
"There's no fooling you (the classics)," Peres Projects, Los Angeles
"Montezuma's Revenge," Nicole Klagsbrun, New York City, NY
"The Zine UnBound: Kults, Werewolves and Sarcastic Hippies," Yerba Buena Center for the Arts, San Francisco, CA
"Growing Up Absurd," Hebert Read Gallery, Kent, England
 2011: Geheimgesellschaften. Wissen Wagen Wollen, Schirn Kunsthalle, Frankfurt am Main, Germany

Education 
1998	BFA, University of Wisconsin–Madison, Madison, WI
2004	MFA, University of Iowa, Iowa City, IA

References

External links
https://web.archive.org/web/20080703183001/http://www.vilmagold.com/newpages/previous/dan1.htm
http://www.saatchi-gallery.co.uk/artists/dan_attoe.htm
http://beautifuldecay.com/2010/06/28/interview-dan-attoe/
http://www.paintallica.com

Living people
People from Bremerton, Washington
University of Wisconsin–Madison alumni
20th-century American painters
American male painters
21st-century American painters
1975 births
20th-century American sculptors
20th-century American male artists
American male sculptors
21st-century American male artists